Ruwan (Sinhala: රුවන්) is a Sri Lankan name that may refer to
Ruwan Chathuranga (born 1989), Sri Lankan cricketer
Ruwan Herath (born 1984), Sri Lankan cricketer
Ruwan Kalpage (born 1970), Sri Lankan cricketer
Ruwan Ranatunga (born 1971), Sri Lankan politician
Ruwan Wijewardene (born 1975), Sri Lankan politician
Jeewaka Ruwan Kulatunga, Sri Lankan Army major general
Chaminda Ruwan (born 1979), Sri Lankan born cricketer
Dilip Ruwan (born 1991), Sri Lankan sprinter  
Sammika Ruwan (born 1985), Sri Lankan cricketer

Sinhalese masculine given names